Cheltenham Leckhampton railway station in Gloucestershire served the village of Leckhampton and the southern outskirts of Cheltenham Spa.

History

The station began operating in 1881 with the opening of the Bourton-on-the-Water to Cheltenham section of the Banbury and Cheltenham Direct Railway.  This was run by the Great Western Railway which thereafter took over full responsibility for it.

The M&SWJR had running rights over the GWR line.

The station was originally called Leckhampton, acquiring its longer name in 1906. It was renamed Cheltenham Leckhampton in 1952.

It was a small station with a brick building. The line through it was particularly busy during the First World War and the Second World War with heavy troop and machinery movements on the M&SWJR. Traffic declined rapidly thereafter.

The M&SWJR line closed to passenger traffic in September 1961, and services on the Banbury to Cheltenham line were withdrawn on 15 October 1962, when the station closed. The site of the station is now occupied by Leckhampton Place, a residential development, and Liddington Park Industrial Estate; both accessed via Old Station Drive.

References

 Mike Oakley, Gloucestershire Railway Stations, 2003, Dovecote Press, Wimborne, pp41–42

Disused railway stations in Gloucestershire
Former Great Western Railway stations
Railway stations in Great Britain opened in 1881
Railway stations in Great Britain closed in 1962
1881 establishments in England
Leckhampton